Brenta may refer to:

 Brenta (river), Italy
 Brenta, Lombardy, a commune (municipality)
 Brenta Group, mountain
 Brenta (Milan Metro), a metro station
 Brenta Valley
 Brenta (surname)

See also 

 Brena (disambiguation)
 Brenda (disambiguation)